Lentinus is a genus of fungi in the family Polyporaceae. The genus is widely distributed, with many species found in subtropical regions.

The genus name Lentinus is derived from the Latin lent, meaning "pliable", and inus, meaning "resembling".

Species

, Index Fungorum accepts 120 species of Lentinus. The genus includes:
L. anastomosans Rick (1938)
L. anthocephalus (Lév.) Pegler (1971)
L. araucariae Har. & Pat. (1903)
L. arcularius (Batsch) Zmitr. (2010)
L. atrobrunneus Pegler (1971)
L. badius (Berk.) Berk. (1847)
L. baguirmiensis Pat. & Har. (1908)
L. bambusinus T.K.A.Kumar & Manim. (2005)
L. berteroi (Fr.) Fr. (1825)
L. brumalis (Pers.) Zmitr. (2010)
L. brunneofloccosus Pegler (1971)
L. caesariatus Pat. (1924)
L. calyx (Speg.) Pegler (1983)
L. campinensis Teixeira (1946)
L. candidus P.W.Graff (1913)
L. chordalis Lloyd (1919)
L. chudaei Har. & Pat. (1912)
L. cochlearis (Pers.) Bres. (1903)
L. concavus (Berk.) Corner (1981)
L. concentricus Karun., K.D.Hyde & Zhu L.Yang (2011)
L. concinnus Pat. (1892)
L. connatus Berk. (1842)
L. copulatus (Ehrenb.) Henn. (1898)
L. cordubensis Speg. (1902)
L. courtetianus Har. & Pat. (1909)
L. crinitus (L.) Fr. (1825)
L. densifolius R.Heim & L.Rémy (1926)
L. dicholamellatus Manim. (2004)
L. egregius Massee (1910)
L. elmeri Bres. (1912)
L. elmerianus Lloyd (1922)
L. erosus Lloyd (1925)
L. erringtonii Pat. & Har. (1900)
L. fasciatus Berk. (1840)
L. favoloides R.Heim (1964)
L. floridanus (Murrill) Murrill (1943)
L. fluxus Herp. (1912)
L. freemanii Murrill (1919)
L. fuscoexactus Lloyd (1922)
L. fuscus Lloyd (1925)
L. fusipes Cooke & Massee (1887)
L. gibbsiae A.L.Sm. (1909)
L. glabratus Mont. (1842)
L. gogoensis Har. & Pat. (1909)
L. goossensiae Beeli (1928)
L. graminicola Murrill (1911)
L. huensis Lloyd (1922)
L. integrus Reichert (1921)
L. inverseconicus Pat. (1923)
L. isabellina Lloyd (1922)
L. lagunensis P.W.Graff (1913)
L. lamelliporus Har. & Pat. (1902)
L. lateripes Lloyd (1922)
L. ledermannii Pilát (1936)
L. lepideus Fr. (choice edible)
L. levis (Berk. & M.A.Curtis) Murrill (1915) (edible when young)
L. lividus Beeli (1928)
L. luteoapplanatus Beeli (1928)
L. macgregorii P.W.Graff (1913)
L. martianoffianus Kalchbr. (1877)
L. megacystidiatus Karun., K.D.Hyde & Zhu L.Yang (2011)
L. melzeri Velen. (1920)
L. metatensis Bacc. (1917)
L. mitissimus Bigeard & H.Guill. (1913)
L. mollipes Pat. (1917)
L. nigro-osseus Pilát (1936)
L. nigroglaber Lloyd (1923)
L. nigroglabrus Lloyd (1923)
L. ochraceus Lloyd (1920)
L. ochroleucus Beeli (1928)
L. omphalopsis Reichert (1921)
L. orizabensis Murrill (1915)
L. palauensis Imazeki (1941)
L. palmeri (Earle) Sacc. & Traverso (1911)
L. panziensis Singer (1973)
L. papillatus (Henn.) Henn. (1905)
L. pertenuis Lloyd (1922)
L. phillipsii Van der Byl (1926)
L. pholiotaeformis Velen. (1939)
L. pilososquamulosus Lj.N.Vassiljeva (1973)
L. piperatus Beeli (1928)
L. polychrous Lév. (1844)
L. prancei Singer (1981)
L. prolifer (Pat. & Har.) D.A.Reid (1977)
L. pulcherrimus Sumst. (1907)
L. ramosii Lloyd (1923)
L. ramosipes Har. & Pat. (1909)
L. retinervis Pegler (1983)
L. roseus Karun., K.D.Hyde & Zhu L.Yang (2011)
L. rubescens Velen. (1939)
L. sajor-caju (Fr.) Fr. (1838)
L. samarensis Pilát (1941)
L. sayanus Singer (1952)
L. sclerogenus Sacc. (1916)
L. scleropus (Pers.) Fr. (1836)
L. sibiricus Pilát (1936)
L. similans (Earle) Sacc. & Traverso (1911)
L. squamosus Quél. (1888)
L. squarrosulus Mont. (1842)
L. striatulus Lév. (1846)
L. stuppeus Klotzsch (1833)
L. subdulcis Berk. (1851)
L. subscyphoides Murrill (1911)
L. swartzii Berk. (1843)
L. terrestris Lloyd (1925)
L. thomensis Cout. (1925)
L. tigrinoides Corner (1981)
L. tigrinus (Bull.) Fr. (1825)
L. tuber-regium (Fr.) Fr. (1836)
L. umbrinus Reichardt (1866)
L. velutinus Fr. (1830)
L. vestidus (Earle) Sacc. & Traverso (1912)
L. villosus Klotzsch (1833)
L. zelandicus Sacc. & Cub. (1887)
L. zenkerianus Henn. (1905)
L. zeyheri Berk. (1843)

Some molecular studies showed that some Polyporus species belong to the Lentinus-radiation.

References

Taxa named by Elias Magnus Fries
Polyporaceae
Polyporales genera
Fungi described in 1825